Mallophora fautrix is a species of robber flies in the family Asilidae.

References

Further reading

External links

 
 
 

Asilidae
Insects described in 1887